Bromma socken may refer to:
Bromma socken, Sollentuna Hundred, former socken in Sollentuna Hundred, Uppland
Bromma socken, Herrestad Hundred, former socken in Herrestad Hundred, Skåne

See also 
 Bromma Parish